Panutche Amadu Pereira Camará (born 28 February 1997) is a Bissau-Guinean professional footballer who plays for Ipswich Town as a midfielder and forward.

Club career

Early career
He made 15 appearances for Hamlet, scoring four goals.

Crawley Town
Camará signed a two-year professional contract with Crawley Town in June 2017. He scored his first goal for Crawley on his debut in a 5–1 EFL Cup defeat at Birmingham City on 8 August 2017. In 2017–18, he made 34 appearances in all competitions, scoring three goals. In 2018–19, he appeared regularly for the Reds, making 50 appearances in all competitions, also scoring three goals. In May 2019, Crawley extended his contract to the end of the 2019–20 season. He was offered a new contract by Crawley at the end of the 2019–20 season, though Camará rejected the offer and chose to leave the club.

Plymouth Argyle
On 7 August 2020, Camará signed for Plymouth Argyle on a free transfer following his release from Crawley. He scored his first goal for Plymouth in an EFL Cup tie against Leyton Orient on 15 September 2020. Plymouth exercised their option to extend Camará's contract at the end of the 2021–22 season. Despite this, Camará was made available for transfer with him showing no intent of signing a new improved contract with the club.

Ipswich Town
Camará signed for Ipswich Town on 1 September 2022 on a two-year deal for around £500,000.

International career
In June 2021, Camará received his first international call-up from Guinea-Bissau for a friendly against Cape Verde, but the match was cancelled after a fault with the Cape Verde plane meant they could not get to the game. He was named in Guinea-Bissau's 24-man squad for the 2021 Africa Cup of Nations. He debuted with them in a 0–0 2021 Africa Cup of Nations tie with Sudan on 11 January 2022.

He scored his first international goal in a friendly match against Equatorial Guinea on 23 March 2022.

Career statistics

Club

International

International goals
As of match played 23 March 2022. Guinea-Bissau score listed first, score column indicates score after each Camará goal.

References

1997 births
Living people
People from Cacheu Region
Bissau-Guinean footballers
Guinea-Bissau international footballers
Association football midfielders
Association football forwards
Vitória S.C. players
Barnsley F.C. players
Dulwich Hamlet F.C. players
Crawley Town F.C. players
Plymouth Argyle F.C. players
English Football League players
Isthmian League players
2021 Africa Cup of Nations players
Bissau-Guinean expatriate footballers
Bissau-Guinean expatriate sportspeople in England
Expatriate footballers in England
GS Loures players
Ipswich Town F.C. players